The Hamburg University Archive is a central institution of the University of Hamburg. As a public archive, it serves research and teaching at the university, its self-administration and legal protection.  A special feature of the Hamburg University Archive is the responsibility for university records management, which binds the archive very closely to the university administration.

History 
The University Archives are the repository of the archival administrative records of the University of Hamburg and its predecessor institutions. In addition, the University Archive collects the estates of university members and objects of university history. The records accessible in the University Archive date back to the early 19th century. It documents, among other things, the emergence of the University of Hamburg during the Weimar Republic, the phase of renaming the university to Hansische Universität during the Nazi era, the reopening of the University of Hamburg in 1945, and its path from student protests to the modern university in the 21st century. Since its foundation until 2014, the holdings have been kept in the Hamburg State Archives. An agreement was reached between the University Archives and the State Archives in 2016. This agreement regulates, among other things, the answering of various questions about the holdings in the reading room of the State Archives. The inspection of archive material for scientific, personal and journalistic purposes is possible for any person.

Hamburg matriculation portal 
The Hamburg Matriculation Portal enables research in the matriculation of the University of Hamburg. It offers information on all students who studied in Hamburg between 1919 and 1935.  On the occasion of the 100th birthday of the University of Hamburg, the database went online, in which all students from the years 1919 to 1935 are listed. In addition to approximately 35,000 entries with matriculation data, the digitized original volumes of the university matriculation register are also available.  These books contained handwritten information on enrolment for each of the then four faculties.

References

External links 

 Main website

2014 establishments in Germany
archive
Archives in Germany